The Aeromot AMT-200 Super Ximango is a Brazilian motor glider developed from the AMT-100 Ximango but fitted with a Rotax 912 engine.

Design and development
Built from glassfibre, the Super Ximango is a low-wing cantilever monoplane with conventional landing gear and a T-tail. Powered by front-mounted 80 hp Rotax 912A, it has an enclosed side-by-side cockpit for two. The wings fold for storage or transportation.

Variants
AMT-200
Rotax 912A powered variant in the Utility category.
AMT-200S
Rotax 912S4 powered variant in the Utility category.
AMT-200SO
Reconnaissance variant of the AMT-200S in the Restricted category

Operators

United States Air Force – operated by the U.S. Air Force Academy as the TG-14.
NASA – operated at Armstrong Flight Research Center as the TG-14.

 Military Police of Paraná State – operated in patrol of environmental policing.

 Dominican Air Force

Specification

References

Bibliography

 
.

External links

 .

1990s Brazilian sport aircraft
Motor gliders
Low-wing aircraft
Single-engined tractor aircraft
T-tail aircraft
Aircraft first flown in 1993